Whyalla Playford is a suburb of Whyalla in South Australia. It is bounded on the east and south by the Lincoln Highway and on the north by the BHP Whyalla Tramway. It was gazetted in 1967 with the boundaries adjusted in 1975 and 2000.

References

Suburbs of Whyalla